The Traverse des Sioux Library System (TdS) is a regional public library system in south-central Minnesota, founded in 1975. Mankato is the seat of the library administration.

Counties served 
 Blue Earth
 Brown
 Faribault
 Le Sueur
 Martin
 Nicollet
 Sibley
 Waseca
 Watonwan

Branch locations 
 Arlington
 Blue Earth
 Butterfield
 Ceylon
 Comfrey
 Darfur
 Dunnell
 Elmore
 Elysian
 Fairmont
 Gaylord
 Gibbon
 Hanska
 Henderson
 Janesville
 Lake Crystal
 Le Center
 Le Sueur
 Lewisville
 Madelia
 Mankato
 Mapleton
 Montgomery
 New Richland
 New Ulm
 North Mankato
 St. James
 St. Peter
 Sherburn
 Sleepy Eye
 Springfield
 Trimont
 Truman
 Waldorf
 Waseca
 Waterville
 Welcome
 Wells
 Winnebago
 Winthrop

External links
 Official website

1975 establishments in Minnesota
Public libraries in Minnesota
Education in Blue Earth County, Minnesota
Education in Brown County, Minnesota
Education in Faribault County, Minnesota
Education in Le Sueur County, Minnesota
Education in Martin County, Minnesota
Education in Nicollet County, Minnesota
Education in Sibley County, Minnesota
Education in Waseca County, Minnesota
Education in Watonwan County, Minnesota